Marr Ice Piedmont is a large ice piedmont which covers the northwestern half of Anvers Island, in the Palmer Archipelago, Antarctica. This feature was presumably first seen by a German expedition under Eduard Dallmann, 1873–74, and was first roughly surveyed by the French Antarctic Expedition, 1903–05, and French Antarctic Expedition, 1908–10, both under Jean-Baptiste Charcot. It was named by the UK Antarctic Place-Names Committee for British marine biologist James W.S. Marr, first commander of the Falkland Islands Dependencies Survey, 1943–45, and leader of the base at nearby Port Lockroy. Marr was also a member of the British Australian New Zealand Antarctic Research Expedition under Mawson, 1929–31, and of Shackleton's expedition of 1921–22.

References

Ice piedmonts of Graham Land
Geography of Anvers Island
Landforms of the Palmer Archipelago